Joaquín García Borrero was a Colombian engineer, politician, historian and writer. He is remembered for his contributions to the progress of Huila Department. He was member of the Colombian Chamber of Representatives, Senator of Colombia and Governor of Huila Department.

García was member of the Academia Colombiana de la Lengua and the Academia Colombiana de la historia. He was the founder and first president of the Centro Departamental de Historia which originated the current Academia Huilense de Historia.

In 1998, 50 years after his death, García received the Orden de la Democracia Simón Bolívar given by the Colombian Chamber of Representatives given as a recognition to people and institutions which have worked to improve society and democracy.

Early years
Joaquín García Borrero was born in Gigante, Huila in 1894. His parents were Abelardo García Salas and María Inés Borrero Alvarez. He had descended from prominent individuals such as Neiva's Governor Joaquín García Bernabeu, his grandfather, and Colombia's independence war patriot Benito Salas Vargas, his great-great-grandfather.

Bibliography

Books
El Huila y sus aspectos (Sociology)
Neiva en el Siglo XVII (History)
Algos (Poetry)

Other works
La leyenda del agua (1933)
La ciudad de los Ángeles del Nuevo Potosí
El último Mendivil (1933)

References

Colombian Liberal Party politicians
Cornell University alumni
Members of the Chamber of Representatives of Colombia
Members of the Senate of Colombia
Colombian civil engineers
People from Huila Department
Governors of Huila Department
1894 births
1948 deaths